John Mark Eustace (born 3 November 1979) is an English professional football coach and former player who is head coach of  club Birmingham City.

During his playing career, he played as a central midfielder for Coventry City, Stoke City, Watford and Derby County. He also spent time on loan at Dundee United, Middlesbrough and Hereford United. 

After retiring as a player, Eustace served as manager of Kidderminster Harriers between 2016 and 2018, eventually leaving to become assistant manager of Queens Park Rangers in 2018. He had a brief spell as caretaker manager at QPR in 2019.

Playing career

Coventry City
Born in Solihull, Eustace began his career as a trainee at Coventry City. Despite the fact that he was at the club for seven years, he only recorded 98 appearances in all competitions due to injuries. At 19 he went out on loan to Dundee United to gain first team experience. He played eleven matches and scored one goal against Hearts, becoming a firm favourite with United fans who voted him their young player of the year.

He returned to Coventry where he began to establish himself in the first team. In the 2000–01 season, he appeared in 32 league games. Despite his efforts, the club were relegated from the Premier League. At the start of the next season, he was named as captain by manager Gordon Strachan. However, on 8 September 2001, Eustace was struck down with a knee injury during Coventry's league defeat to Grimsby which kept him sidelined for 7 months. He returned to action in April 2002. 

Eustace started the 2002–03 season well and attracted interest from Premier League club Middlesbrough, to whom he was loaned out for one month in January 2003. He only made one substitute appearance, away to Liverpool, where he appeared for only the final two minutes of the game, but earned himself a yellow card. Eustace made 33 league appearances over the season, his last with Coventry.

Stoke City
At the start of the 2003–04 season, Eustace left Coventry for fellow second-tier team Stoke City on a free transfer. He made his debut in a 3–0 win over Derby County at the start of the 2003–04 season and helped the side to 11th place in the Championship, scoring five goals. Injury problems restricted him to a handful of appearances over the next two seasons – in the Potters' 1–0 win over Wigan Athletic in February 2005, Eustace suffered a knee injury and was then substituted, in only his 8th appearance of the season. It later became clear that his injury would keep him out for at least the rest of the season. He missed the rest of the 2004–05 season and all of the 2005–06 season because of the injury. However, Eustace signed a one-year contract extension at the beginning of the season, which lasted until the end of the 2006–07 season.

Eustace returned from his long injury lay off in June 2006. He made his first appearance for Stoke City in over 18 months in their 2–0 friendly win over local opposition Newcastle Town. On 13 October 2006, Eustace joined Hereford United on loan to gain first team football to aid his comeback. During his time at Edgar Street he was a key part of the Hereford midfield, and his loan was extended to the New Year. However, on 14 December 2006 he was suddenly recalled by Stoke due to them suffering several injuries in midfield. John's grandfather Ken Eustace also played one match for Hereford during the 1949–50 season.

Eustace returned to the Stoke starting line up in the 3rd round FA Cup match against Millwall. On 11 February 2007, he started his first league match of the season in Stoke's 1–0 loss to Birmingham City. In total, Eustace made 23 league appearances over the course of the season for Stoke and Hereford. Eustace later signed a one-year contract extension with the club, to take him up until the summer of 2008. He was a regular for Stoke during the first half of the 2007–08 season and captained the team up until his move to Watford on the last day of the transfer window.

Watford

On 31 January 2008, Eustace joined Watford from Stoke City for a fee of £250,000. On 20 September 2008, Eustace "scored" a bizarre opening own goal in the game between Watford and Reading, where a goalmouth scramble saw the ball go nowhere near the goal line, despite the linesman flagging for a goal to the bemusement of everyone in the ground. A corner from Stephen Hunt bounced off of Eustace and was hooked back by Noel Hunt. What could have been a debatable corner for Reading, initially given as a goal kick, was actually then given as a goal. The game ended Watford 2–2 Reading.

On 9 March 2009, he joined Championship rivals Derby County on loan until the end of the 2008/09 season, in order to help solve the Rams' midfield injury crisis. He made his Derby debut in the 1–1 draw away to Southampton, and scored against his parent club on the final day of the season. However, Eustace failed to secure a permanent move to Derby at the end of his loan spell with the club and returned to Watford at the beginning of May. However, Derby manager Nigel Clough said "He's got a year left at Watford. If he's still in the same situation at the start of next season, needing a loan, then we might look at that."

With his Hornets career seemingly in jeopardy, Eustace signed an amended contract stipulating that he would not receive his sizeable appearance fee, freeing up Malky Mackay to pick the tenacious midfielder. After being handed the number 28 jersey for the season, Eustace went on to play an instrumental role as Watford retained their Championship status for another season. Eustace was also handed the captaincy on a number of occasions with first-choice skipper Jay DeMerit sidelined through injury. Eustace made over forty appearances in league and cup competitions and was the 'Player's Player of the Season' as voted by his peers.

After much speculation throughout the 2009–10 off-season, Eustace finally put pen-to-paper on a new two-year contract with Watford. Eustace and Mackay later revealed that he had passed a medical at Leeds United, and that there was interest from other clubs.

Ahead of the season, Mackay handed Eustace the captaincy, after DeMerit was released on a Bosman transfer. He started the season in good form, scoring Watford's first goal of the season in a 3–2 win at Norwich City, followed a week later with an over-head finish in a 2–2 draw against former club Coventry which turned out to be 2010/11 goal of the season. Eustace kept the captain's armband following the managerial appointment of Sean Dyche in June 2011 and signed a new two-year contract until 2013 at the end of July despite interest from Derby County.
In June 2013, Eustace was offered a new contract with a player/coach role, which he declined, stating that he was not ready to turn away from playing just yet, therefore leaving the club as a free agent.

Derby County
In July 2013, it was confirmed by Derby County that Eustace had rejoined the club on trial, with a view to earning a contract and after impressing Nigel Clough in pre-season training and friendly games, Eustace verbally agreed a one-year contract with Derby and the move was made official on 24 July. Eustace was originally expected to play a bit part role and according to Clough Eustace was to act as cover in his natural central midfield position as well as being an emergency central defender. Eustace came on as a late substitute for Will Hughes in Derby's opening game against Blackburn Rovers. His first Derby start was in the 1–0 League Cup win at Oldham Athletic. Eustace scored the first goal of his second spell at Derby with a looping header against Queens Park Rangers on 10 February 2014, at Pride Park.

He picked up a serious knee cartilage injury against Ipswich Town in a 1–0 victory on 10 January 2015, a focal point in defensive central midfield, Eustace had only been on the losing side once in 14 appearances prior to his injury for Derby during the 2014–15 season. His manager Steve McClaren described Eustace's injury as a 'big blow'. The injury required an operation and ruled him out for the remainder of the season. Eustace was released by Derby in June 2015.

On 22 June 2015, Eustace was linked with a move to Scottish giants Rangers, with newly appointed manager Mark Warburton claiming, "People like John Eustace are few and far between, people like John are ultra-professional on and off the pitch. They are great role models. If you look at his record and the win ratio when John's playing, it's really important. He had a big role to play at Derby over the last few years." Despite the link to Rangers, Eustace retired from playing due to his injury.

Coaching career
Following his retirement as a player, Eustace moved into coaching. On 21 April 2016, he was named manager of National League side Kidderminster Harriers, signing a one-year contract until the end of the 2016–17 season. While at the club, Eustace transformed the side's style of play, with the Harriers being dubbed the "non-league Barcelona". Eustace led his side to the play-offs in two seasons, as well as the First Round Proper of the FA Cup. 

He left the club on 25 May 2018 to join former manager Steve McClaren at Queens Park Rangers as assistant manager. At QPR, he had a brief spell as caretaker manager in 2019, helping the club avoid relegation from the Championship with 7 points from his 7 games in charge. Following Mark Warburton's arrival as manager in May 2019, Eustace remained as his assistant and began studying for his UEFA Pro Licence.
In March 2022 he was named as Assistant Manager of the Republic of Ireland team under manager Stephen Kenny, while he would also continue his existing role at QPR.
Eustace, along with Matt Gardiner, left his role at QPR in June 2022 following the appointment of new manager Michael Beale.

Eustace succeeded Lee Bowyer as head coach of Championship club Birmingham City on 3 July 2022. He signed a three-year contract.

Career statistics

As a player
Source:

As a manager

References

External links

1979 births
English footballers
Living people
Association football midfielders
Coventry City F.C. players
Derby County F.C. players
Dundee United F.C. players
Middlesbrough F.C. players
Stoke City F.C. players
Hereford United F.C. players
Watford F.C. players
Premier League players
Sportspeople from Solihull
Scottish Premier League players
English Football League players
English football managers
Kidderminster Harriers F.C. managers
Birmingham City F.C. managers
Queens Park Rangers F.C. non-playing staff
Association football coaches
National League (English football) managers
English Football League managers